Thomas Milton (November 14, 1893 – July 10, 1962) was an American race car driver best known as the first two-time winner of the Indianapolis 500. He was notable for having only one functional eye, a disability that would have disqualified him from competing in modern motorsports.

Biography
Milton was born in St. Paul, Minnesota, on November 14, 1893. He began his career in racing in 1914, competing on dirt tracks in the Midwestern United States. By 1917, he was competing nationwide, and earned his first major win at a track in Providence, Rhode Island. In 1919, he was one of the dominant figures in American racing, winning five of the nine championship races including the International Sweepstakes at Sheepshead Bay, New York, and making his debut at the Indianapolis 500. Later that year he suffered severe burns when his car burst into flames during a race at Uniontown, Pennsylvania. He returned to the track the following year to win the Universal Trophy on June 19. In 1921, Milton won the United States National Driving Championship, often referred to as the  Champ Car series.

Record at the Indianapolis 500

Milton was a starter in the Indianapolis 500 eight times, earning the pole position once, and finishing in the top five on four occasions. He drove for Duesenberg his first time in 1919 and again the following year when he finished third. In 1921, the twenty-seven-year-old Milton won the celebrated race driving a straight-eight Frontenac built by Louis Chevrolet. In 1922 fuel tank problems forced Milton out of the race after only forty-four laps, but he came back in 1923 driving for the H.C.S. Motor Co. with a Miller 122 and won the race for the second time. His last was the 1927 Indianapolis 500 where he finished eighth.

At the 1936 race, Milton returned to the Indianapolis Motor Speedway to drive the Packard 120  Pace Car. At his suggestion, the tradition of giving the race winner the Pace Car began that year. In 1949 Milton was appointed chief steward for the Indianapolis 500. Health problems forced him to retire in 1957.

Death
Milton died in 1962 in Mount Clemens, Michigan, at the age of 68 of self-inflicted gunshot wounds.

Indy 500 results

Awards
Milton was inducted in the Indianapolis Motor Speedway Hall of Fame in 1954.
He was inducted in the National Sprint Car Hall of Fame in 1992.
He was inducted into the Motorsports Hall of Fame of America in 1998.

References

Further reading
Trimble, Steven C., Tommy Milton "St. Paul's Speed King", Ramsey County History Quarterly V42 #4, Ramsey County Historical Society, St Paul, MN, 2008.

External links 

Tommy Milton – Website of the Ramsey County Historical Society, St Paul MN, with an online exhibit sharing photos of Milton based on an article in the Ramsey County History Quarterly.
The Greatest 33

1893 births
1962 suicides
Champ Car champions
Indianapolis 500 drivers
Indianapolis 500 polesitters
Indianapolis 500 winners
National Sprint Car Hall of Fame inductees
Sportspeople from Saint Paul, Minnesota
AAA Championship Car drivers
Racing drivers from Minnesota
1962 deaths
Suicides by firearm in Michigan
Multiple gunshot suicides